Waqas Ahmed (born 24 January 1979) is a Pakistani cricketer. He played in 87 first-class and 73 List A matches between 1997 and 2008. He made his Twenty20 debut on 26 April 2005, for Lahore Eagles in the 2004–05 National Twenty20 Cup.

References

External links
 

1979 births
Living people
Pakistani cricketers
Lahore cricketers
Lahore Eagles cricketers
Lahore Lions cricketers
Redco Pakistan Limited cricketers
Sui Northern Gas Pipelines Limited cricketers
Water and Power Development Authority cricketers
Cricketers from Lahore